Scutellinia olivascens is a species of apothecial fungus belonging to the family Pyronemataceae. This European fungus forms clusters of orange discs up to 1.5 cm in diameter on soil or rotting wood in summer and autumn. It is very similar to the common species Scutellinia umbrorum and can only be reliably identified by microscopic features.

The species was described in 1876 by Mordecai Cooke as Peziza olivascens, but Otto Kuntze revised the genus to Scutellinia in 1891.

References

Pyronemataceae
Fungi described in 1876
Taxa named by Mordecai Cubitt Cooke